Tork-e Sharqi Rural District is a rural district (dehestan) in Jowkar District, Malayer County, Hamadan Province, Iran. At the 2006 census, its population was 11,003, in 2,492 families. The rural district has 9 villages.

References 

Rural Districts of Hamadan Province
Malayer County